Fethard may refer to:

Places
 Fethard, County Tipperary
 Fethard-on-Sea, County Wexford

Constituencies
Fethard (County Tipperary) (Parliament of Ireland constituency)
Fethard (County Wexford) (Parliament of Ireland constituency)